is a Japanese football player. He plays for Kyoto Sanga FC.

Career
Shogo Asada joined J2 League club Kyoto Sanga FC in 2017.

Club statistics
Updated to 20 July 2022.

References

External links
Profile at Kamatamare Sanuki

1998 births
Living people
Association football people from Nagano Prefecture
Japanese footballers
J1 League players
J2 League players
J3 League players
Kyoto Sanga FC players
Kamatamare Sanuki players
Association football defenders